Montornès del Vallès is a municipality in the province of Barcelona and autonomous community of Catalonia, Spain.

History 

The  was one of the battles of the Second War of the Remences, and occurred here on January 4, 1485.

References

External links
 Government data pages 

Municipalities in Vallès Oriental